CBVE-FM is a Canadian radio station, which broadcasts the programming of the CBC Radio One network at 104.7 FM in Quebec City, Quebec. The station's main transmitter is located at Mount Bélair. Its studios are co-located with its francophone sister stations on Rue St-Jean in Downtown Quebec City.

CBVE is the originating station for all CBC Radio One transmitters in Quebec outside Montreal and the Outaouais. Together, they are known as the Quebec Community Network, with a special mandate to provide service to the province's anglophone minority.

Although it is a semi-satellite of CBME-FM in Montreal, most of the station's operations are in Quebec City except for master control, which is based at the Canadian Broadcasting Centre in Toronto.

History
The station was launched in 1976. Prior to its launch, CBC Radio programming was aired on private affiliate CFOM. Following CFOM's shutdown as a commercial station in late 1975, the CBC directly acquired the station and kept it in operation until the FM signal was launched.

The station was originally a rebroadcaster of CBM in Montreal (now CBME-FM). In 1994, however, it was granted a separate license. At the same time, all but one of CBM's rebroadcasters were transferred to CBVE.

The call sign CBME was formerly used for a low-power AM repeater in La Tuque which changed to CBVE-1.

Local programming
CBVE-FM's local programs are Quebec AM, hosted by Susan Campbell, in the mornings and Breakaway, hosted by Jacquie Czernin, in the afternoons. The rest of the station's schedule is a simulcast of CBME-FM.

An hour of Quebec AM is also heard on CBC North radio stations in the Nunavik region of northern Quebec.

Transmitters

AM

FM

On September 11, 2008, the CRTC approved the CBC's application to operate a temporary low-power FM mono transmitter at Lac-Mégantic. It would broadcast on 104.1 MHz with an effective radiated power of 50 watts for a period of three months. The CBC indicated the transmitter would rebroadcast CBVE and ensure the continuity of the national Radio One service to Lac-Megantic while the municipality conducts renovations on the site of the low-power AM transmitter CBMO, which was currently unserviceable. It is unknown if the transmitter(s) is currently operating as CBMO and CBMO-FM is not listed in the Industry Canada database.

On January 4, 2013, the CBC filed and application to the CRTC to convert CBMJ 750 to 99.5 FM. The application was approved on May 8, 2013.

On October 25, 2013, the CRTC approved the CBC's application to decrease the power of CBVG from 2,160 to 1,730 watts (decreasing the maximum ERP from 4,250 to 2,610 watts and its EHAAT from 409.5 to 384.5 metres).

On March 19, 2015, the CBC submitted an application to add an FM transmitter in Malartic, CBMN-FM, which would broadcast at 101.1 MHz at 26,480 watts with a maximum ERP of 50,000 watts. In the CRTC's July 3, 2015 release, CBMN's ERP reads 22,800 watts. CBMN would replace two low-powered CBC AM transmitters, CBMN 1230 and CBML 570 Val-d'Or. The new transmitter may also replace CBMM 540, but only pending further assessment following the sign-on of CBMN-FM. The CRTC approved the CBC's application on July 3, 2015.

On February 20, 1992, the CRTC approved the CBC's application to change CBME's frequency to 830 kHz. CBME's change of frequency was necessary to eliminate nighttime interference received from CKIS Montréal which also operated on the 990 kHz frequency.

On April 4, 2016, the CBC filed and application to the CRTC to convert CBVE-1 to 101.9. The CRTC approved the CBC's application on June 16, 2016 to move CBVE-1 to 101.9 with an average effective radiated power of 265 watts and an effective height of antenna above average terrain of 106.2 metres. According to Canadian Radio News, CBVE-1 moved to 101.9 in August 2016.

On September 23, 2016, the CRTC approved the CBC's application to change the frequency of CBMA-FM 99.9 to 91.9 MHz by increasing the effective radiated power from 1,000 to 2,712 watts and decrease the effective height of antenna above average terrain from 145 to 110.2 metres.

On March 8, 2017, the CBC applied to convert CBMM 540 to 101.7 FM with the proposed callsign CBMM-FM.

On March 9, 2017, the CBC applied to convert CBMK 1230 to 92.7 FM.
The CRTC approved the CBC's application to operate new FM transmitters in Lebel-sur-Quevillon and Senneterre on July 27, 2017.

In July 2020, CBMP-FM, previously a rebroadcaster of CBVE, formed its own network.

On May 6, 2022, the CRTC approved the CBC's application to increasing the maximum effective radiated power (ERP) from 420 to 29,939 watts, increasing the average ERP from 420 to 11,837 watts, replacing the existing non-directional antenna with a new directional antenna, and by decreasing the effective height of the antenna above average terrain from 110.5 to 108.5 metres and changing from class A to class B. The power increase would cover Chapais, Quebec which may no longer need the low-power AM CBC rebroadcast transmitter, CBMD operating at 1400 kHz.

References

External links
 CBC Quebec
 
 

BVE
BVE
BVE
Radio stations established in 1976
1976 establishments in Quebec
Quebec Anglophone culture in Quebec City